The United States Department of Defense acknowledges holding one Danish captive in Guantanamo.
A total of 778 captives have been held in extrajudicial detention in the Guantanamo Bay detention camps, in Cuba since the camps opened on January 11, 2002
The camp population peaked in 2004 at approximately 660.  Only nineteen new captives, all "high value detainees" have been transferred there since the United States Supreme Court's ruling in Rasul v. Bush.  As of January 2008 the camp population stand at approximately 285.

Slimane Hadj Abderrahmane, the sole Danish captive in Guantanamo, was repatriated prior to the institution of the Combatant Status Review Tribunals.
He was captured, in December 2001, in Afghanistan, near the Pakistan border.
He was transferred to Guantanamo on February 10, 2002.
He was repatriated to Denmark on February 24, 2004.
He is reported to have told reporters he would like to go to Chechnya, to fight Islam's oppressors, but was talked out of it by Danish security officials.

References

Lists of Guantanamo Bay detainees by nationality
Denmark–United States relations